Hans Klinkhammer (born 23 August 1953) is a retired German football player. He spent nine seasons in the Bundesliga with Borussia Mönchengladbach and TSV 1860 München.

Honours
 European Cup finalist: 1976–77
 UEFA Cup winner: 1974–75, 1978–79
 UEFA Cup finalist: 1972–73, 1979–80
 Bundesliga champion: 1974–75, 1975–76, 1976–77
 Bundesliga runner-up: 1973–74, 1977–78
 DFB-Pokal winner: 1972–73

References

External links
 

1953 births
Living people
German footballers
Germany B international footballers
Bundesliga players
2. Bundesliga players
Borussia Mönchengladbach players
TSV 1860 Munich players
SG Union Solingen players
UEFA Cup winning players
Association football defenders
West German footballers
Sportspeople from Mönchengladbach
Footballers from North Rhine-Westphalia